Green Township is one of the fourteen townships of Mahoning County, Ohio, United States. The 2010 census found 3,532 people in the township.

Geography
Located in the southern part of the county, it borders the following townships:
Canfield Township - northeast
Beaver Township - east
Fairfield Township, Columbiana County - southeast corner
Salem Township, Columbiana County - south
Perry Township, Columbiana County - southwest
Goshen Township - west
Ellsworth Township - northwest

Part of the village of Washingtonville is located in southeastern Green Township, and the unincorporated community of Greenford lies at the center of the township.

Name and history
Green Township was established in 1806. For many years, it was one of the northern row of townships in Columbiana County, before becoming part of Mahoning County in 1846.

It is one of sixteen Green Townships statewide.

Government
The township is governed by a three-member board of trustees, who are elected in November of odd-numbered years to a four-year term beginning on the following January 1. Two are elected in the year after the presidential election and one is elected in the year before it. There is also an elected township fiscal officer, who serves a four-year term beginning on April 1 of the year after the election, which is held in November of the year before the presidential election. Vacancies in the fiscal officership or on the board of trustees are filled by the remaining trustees.

References

External links
Township website
County website

Townships in Mahoning County, Ohio
1806 establishments in Ohio
Townships in Ohio